Thirumurugan is an Born: (November 4, 1988) Indian actor who has appeared in Tamil and Malayalam language films as a supporting actor.

Career
Thirumuruga was born in a small village in Thanjavur to Sadasivam, a retired teacher, and Ramalakshmi, a housewife. In the early 2000s, Thirumurugan moved to Chennai to pursue his dreams of becoming a film director and was initially financially supported by his father and sister,S.Padmarangam. He then befriended director Sargunam, who introduced him to director A. L. Vijay, with whom Thirumurugan worked as an assistant in more than 50 commercials and some of his films. When Sargunam got a chance to direct Kalavani (2010), Thirumurugan became his co-director, before then being asked to appear as the antagonist in the film. In 2011, Thirumurugan planned to debut as a director with a film starring Vimal in the lead role, but the project was later shelved.

After more supporting roles in projects including Aravaan (2012) and Eetti (2015), Thirumurugan was cast in the lead role in Onan (2017) by director Sennan Palassery.

Filmography

Kalavani (2010)
Mudhal Idam (2011)
Aravaan (2012)
Ennamo Nadakkudhu (2013)
Parankimala (2014) (Malayalam)
Naalu Policeum Nalla Irundha Oorum (2015)
49-O (2015)
Eetti (2016)
Pencil (2016)
Kattappava Kanom (2017)
Puyala Kilambi Varom (2017)
Onan (2017)
Attu (2017)
Torchlight (2017)

Awards and nominations 
Tamil Nadu State Film Award for Best Villain for Kalavani (2010)

References

External links 

Living people
Male actors in Tamil cinema
21st-century Indian male actors
Tamil comedians
Male actors from Tamil Nadu
People from Thanjavur district
Male actors in Malayalam cinema
Indian male film actors
1988 births